Jan Kauder (16 February 1931 – 29 May 1990) was a Polish footballer. He played in one match for the Poland national football team in 1953.

References

External links
 

1931 births
1990 deaths
Polish footballers
Poland international footballers
Place of birth missing
Association footballers not categorized by position